The Diocese of Linares (also known as the Diocese of San Ambrosio de Linares) is a Latin Church ecclesiastical territory or diocese of the Catholic Church in Linares, Chile. It was established by Pope Pius XI on October 18, 1925 in his papal bull Notabiliter Aucto.

The Diocese of Linares is a suffragan in the ecclesiastical province of the metropolitan Archdiocese of Santiago de Chile. The diocese is located in the geographical center of the country. The diocesan territory comprises two Chilean full provinces, Linares Province and Cauquenes Province, and part of a third, Talca Province, all of them in the Maule Region of Chile. Compared to other Chilean dioceses, Linares has a higher proportion of rural inhabitants. Numerous chapels have been raised particularly in rural areas. The total number of chapels in the diocese exceeds 450.

Brief history of the diocese

In 1963, the territory of the Diocese of Linares expanded to include the parishes of the then Province of Maule (currently known as the Province of Cauquenes) that belonged to the Diocese of Chillán, and a parish (Putú), carved out from Talca Province. Prior to 1925, the territory now comprised by the Diocese was part of the ancient Diocese of La Santísima Concepción –- now the Archdiocese of Concepción. The see of the Diocese and residence of the bishop is the city of Linares. The beautiful Cathedral Church is dedicated to Saint Ambrose of Milan.

Beginnings of Catholicism in the region

Catholic evangelization in Chile began in the middle of the 16th century, shortly after the arrival of the Spaniards. Pedro de Valdivia granted Juan Jofré de Loaiza the encomienda of Peteroa, north of the Maule river on November 1, 1552, and shortly after, on 1554, Doctrina de Peteroa was created under the care of priest Juan de Océs, son of Don Rodrigo de Océs, with orders to cross to "other towns" of remaining Indians to the north and south of the Maule river. As a result of the successful campaigns in southern Chile, the Diocese of Imperial was created on March 22, 1563. Following the Arauco War Bishop Don Reginaldo de Lizárraga went to the King Felipe III to obtain from the Pope the annexation of his Bishopric to the one of Santiago, to which the Supreme Pontiff acceded provisionally. This situation persisted from 1609 until 1623.

On February 18, 1585, the third Bishop of Santiago in his detailed report to King Felipe II mentions the missions of "Longomilla and Purapel", "Chanco and Loanco" taken care of by the presbítero Francisco de Maestanza, with a salary of three hundred and eighty pesos in gold and food.

The Doctrinas of Cauquenes and Putagán

When the dioceses of Santiago and La Imperial were erected (in 1561 and 1564, respectively), the Maule river was considered the dividing line between the two dioceses. However, it seems that the division was not sufficiently clear because the Bishop of Santiago, Fray Diego de Medellín (1576–1592), created two docrinas south of the Maule river that remained under the jurisdiction of the Santiago bishops for more than one hundred and seventy years. The doctrinas at issue were Cauquenes and Putagán. Cauquenes was erected in an area inhabited by the "cauquenes" Indians, who gave name to the region and the doctrina that was based there. In 1739 the Doctrinero Don José de Rozas and Amaza, who resided in Chanco, built a chapel in the seat of Cauquenes, the same place where Don José Antonio Manso de Velasco later founded the Villa de Nuestra Señora de las Mercedes de José de Manso de Tutuvén (Town of Our Lady of the Mercedes de José de Manso of Tutuvén, now Cauquenes) on May 9, 1742.

The Cathedral of San Ambrosio de Linares

The Cathedral Church of San Ambrosio, of Linares Diocese, is considered to be one of the most important and finest religious buildings erected in Chile in the twentieth century. It replaced the original cathedral, after the latter was destroyed by an earthquake, in 1928. The new cathedral was conceived by bishop Juan Subercaseaux Errázuriz and its works were conducted by the renowned Chilean architects Carlos Bresciani and Jorge del Campo, the same duo that would be responsible, several years later, for the construction of another remarkable religious building, that of the parish church of Sagrado Corazón (Sacred Heart) in Providencia, Santiago de Chile.

Mgr. Subercaseaux gave a great initial impulse to the construction of the Linares Cathedral, which has been characterized as "the plastic expression of his refined artistic culture". Mgr. Subercaseaux, a dynamic and enterprising man, was not deterred by the shortage of resources available for the great work that had to be done. In his travels abroad, he was untiring to ask for greater resources for his diocese, which badly required some material aid that would help to finance the cathedral works and additional priests. In several countries (Italy, Germany, the United States, France, the Netherlands) Mgr. Subercaseaux appealed to the local Catholics in their own languages, urging them to contribute to the progress of his far-away diocese.

The cathedral was built according to the model of the famous Basilica of Sant'Ambrogio of Milan, built in Romanesque style and begun in the 4th century. The cathedral apse is remarkable for the outstanding mosaic work made by the Italian-born artist Giulio Di Girolamo. This mosaic work is one of the most important of its sort in South America. On the 18 October 2006 the remains of Giulio Di Girolamo's wife, Elvira, brought from Italy, were buried in the Cathedral together with those of her husband, who had died in 1998 and had been buried in the Cathedral years before.

Diocesan statistics

The Diocese of Linares has an area of 15,111 km² and a population close to 350,000. More than 70% of its inhabitants consider themselves Catholic (2002 Census).

Deaneries, parishes and priests of the diocese

There are 33 parishes grouped into six Deaneries, including: Urban Linares, Parral, Cauquenes, Constitución, San Javier, Rural Linares.

Parishes of the diocese

Urban Linares and rural Linares deaneries
 El Sagrario (Cathedral), Linares 
 Nuestra Señora del Rosario, Linares  
 Inmaculado Corazón de María, Linares  
 María Auxiliadora, Linares  
 Jesús Obrero, Linares  
 Nuestra Señora del Carmen, Linares  
 María Peregrina, Linares  
 San Antonio de Padua, Linares 
 Santos Chilenos, Linares 
 Nuestra Señora de la Buena Esperanza, Panimávida 
 San Miguel Arcángel, Colbún  
 De la Santa Cruz, Yerbas Buenas

San Javier Deanery

 San Francisco Javier, San Javier  
 Santísima Virgen de la Merced, San Javier 
 Santa Rosa, Melozal   
 Del Niño Jesús, Villa Alegre 
 San Francisco, Huerta de Maule   
 San Juan, Orilla de Maule

Parral Deanery

 San José de Parral, Parral
 San Francisco de Parral, Parral  
 San Sebastián de Los Cuarteles, Parral 
 San Lorenzo, Longaví
 San Ramón, Retiro

Constitución Deanery

 San José, Constitución   
 Nuestra Señora del Tránsito, Putú
 Nuestra Señora del Carmen, Nirivilo  
 San Ignacio, Empedrado

Cauquenes Deanery

 San Pedro, Cauquenes  
 San Alfonso, Cauquenes  
 Convento San Francisco, Cauquenes   
 Santo Toribio, Curanipe   
 San Luis Gonzaga, Sauzal
 San Ambrosio, Chanco

Priests of the diocese

Francisco Lavín, Juvenal Pereira, René González, Erasmo Salazar, Plácido Grove, Hernán González, Rolf Schnitzler, Gabriel Lacaux, Jaime Vallet, Ramón Iturra, Luis Alarcón, Germán Cáceres, Silvio Jara, Lorenzo Solari, José Ulloa, Luis Retamal, Benjamín Retamales, Francisco Hormazábal, José Prado, Gonzálo Aravena, Luis Fuentealba, Raúl Moris, Alejandro Quiroz, Waldo Alfaro, Mario Agurto.

Ordinaries

Bishops of Linares
 Miguel León Prado (1925–1934)
 Juan Subercaseaux Errázuriz (1935–1940), appointed Archbishop of La Serena
 Francisco Javier Valdivia Pinedo (1940–1941)
 Roberto Moreira Martínez (1941–1958)
 Augusto Osvaldo Salinas Fuenzalida (1958–1976)
 Carlos Marcio Camus Larenas (1976–2003)
 Tomislav Koljatic Maroevic (2003–present)

Notes

External links
Website of the diocese (in Spanish)
Diocese of Linares at the www.catholic-hierarchy.org website

Roman Catholic dioceses in Chile
Christian organizations established in 1925
Roman Catholic dioceses and prelatures established in the 20th century
Linares, Roman Catholic Diocese of